Neyrazh-e Olya (also Romanized as Neyrazh-e ‘Olyā) is a village in Zamkan Rural District, in the Central District of Salas-e Babajani County, Kermanshah Province, Iran. At the 2006 census, its population was 196, in 40 families.

References 

Populated places in Salas-e Babajani County